Back for You may refer to:

 "Back for You", a 2019 song by Cashmere Cat from Princess Catgirl
 "Back for You", a 2012 song by One Direction from Take Me Home